Risk is the fifth studio album by Canadian country music singer Paul Brandt, released on September 11, 2007 on Brandt's own record label, Brand-T Records.

Track listing
All tracks written by Paul Brandt except where noted.
 "Didn't Even See the Dust" (Brandt, Steve Rosen) – 4:49
 "Come On and Get Some" (Brandt, Rosen) – 3:19
 "Virtual Life" – 3:32
 "Worth Fighting For" – 4:04
 "Risk" – 4:34
 "Country Girl" – 4:04
 "Hold On (Love Will Find You)" (Nichole Nordeman) – 5:53
 "Learning How to Let It Go" – 5:14
 "Scars Are Beautiful" – 4:12
 "A Friend Like This" (Brandt, Rosen) – 4:39
 "The Little Space Between" – 3:35
 "Out Here on My Own" – 3:45

Chart performance

References

Paul Brandt albums
2007 albums
Juno Award for Country Album of the Year albums